The 1903 Australian federal election was held in Australia on 16 December 1903. All 75 seats in the House of Representatives, and 19 of the 36 seats in the Senate were up for election. The incumbent Protectionist Party minority government led by Prime Minister Alfred Deakin retained the most House of Representatives seats of the three parties and retained government with the parliamentary support of the Labour Party led by Chris Watson. The Free Trade Party led by George Reid remained in opposition.

The election outcome saw a finely balanced House of Representatives, with the three parties each holding around a third of seats − the Protectionists on 26, the Free Traders on 24 and Labour on 22. This term of parliament saw no changes in any party leadership but did see very significant and prolonged debates on contentious issues − the Protectionist minority government fell in April 1904 to Labour, while the Labour minority government fell in August 1904 to the Free Traders, while the Free Trader minority government fell in July 1905 back to the Protectionists, which continued until the 1906 election and beyond. The Free Traders remained in opposition throughout this eventful period with the exception of Labour forming the opposition for the first time during the period of the Free Trader minority government. Additionally, the Watson government was the world's first Labour Party government at a national level.

Despite a break in prime ministerships in 1904-05 and 1908–09, this is the first of three consecutive elections in which Deakin was the sitting prime minister.

Issues
The wreck of  outside Port Phillip Bay in late November prompted the government's handling of the White Australia policy to become a campaign issue. Shipwrecked Asian sailors were denied entry to Australia and forced to stay on a crowded tugboat for several days, leading The Argus, Daily Telegraph and The Sydney Morning Herald to accuse the government of cruelty and harming Australia's international reputation. The Age and The Bulletin sided with the government. The issue was "constantly raised" at election meetings, particularly in Victoria and Tasmania.

Results

House of Representatives

Senate

Significance
The election saw the Labour party make significant gains outside New South Wales and Victoria.

As a result of Labour's gains, the numbers of the three parties in Parliament were very close to equal, leading to unstable governments: Alfred Deakin would describe it as a parliament of "three elevens" (three cricket teams). Although the Protectionists were able to retain their minority government with the qualified support of the Labour Party, the equal numbers would see a record three changes of government over the course of the Parliamentary term, with each of the three parties holding office at least once during the term of the Parliament.

The three parties that contested the 1901 election also contested the 1903 election, with only the Protectionists changing leaders: Alfred Deakin was chosen as a result of Edmund Barton's appointment as an inaugural judge of the newly constituted High Court of Australia. The Free Trade Party was again led by George Reid, with the only significant difference in policy between the parties on trade issues: the Protectionists sought to protect Australian industry and agriculture by placing tariffs on imports.

The Free Traders downgraded the view they had last election of having no tariffs to campaigning on minimal tariffs, while the other major party contesting the election was the Labour Party.

This election also saw a minor party, the Tasmanian Revenue Tariff Party, gain an MHR and one Senator. Prior to the 1901 election, the Free Trade Party had been known as the Revenue Tariff Party in some states. However, in 1903 a separate Revenue Tariff Party competed against the FTP in Tasmania. Nevertheless, both of the Revenue Tariff Party members elected joined the Free Trade Party, when the new parliament began sitting.

Like the 1901 election, voting was voluntary and candidates were elected by the first-past-the-post system. The Commonwealth Franchise Act 1902 gave women the vote and the right to stand for federal Parliament, leading to a significant increase in the number of votes cast in the 1903 federal election. Four women stood at the 1903 election – Selina Anderson (Dalley) in the House of Representatives and Vida Goldstein (Victoria), Nellie Martel (New South Wales), and Mary Moore-Bentley (New South Wales) in the Senate. All four stood as independents and all were unsuccessful.

Electorates
Candidates were contesting all 75 House of Representatives and 19 of the 36 Senate seats, a number unchanged from the 1901 election. The House of Representative seats were determined by the population of each state, giving 26 seats to New South Wales, 23 to Victoria, nine to Queensland, seven to South Australia and five to both Western Australia and Tasmania. In 1901, the South Australian and Tasmanian colonial parliaments had not legislated for single member electorates, so their House of Representative members were elected from a single statewide electorate. This had since changed and there were now single member electorates in both states. The newly created seats were Adelaide, Angas, Barker, Boothby, Grey, Hindmarsh and Wakefield (South Australia) and Bass, Darwin, Denison, Franklin and Wilmot (Tasmania).

Each state elected six Senators regardless of population. The Senate was elected by bloc voting rather than the current single transferable vote system. Half the Senators retired as their terms expired, and there was one casual vacancy.

Seats changing hands 

 Members listed in italics did not contest their seat at this election.

Post-election pendulum

See also
 Candidates of the Australian federal election, 1903
 Members of the Australian House of Representatives, 1903–1906
 Members of the Australian Senate, 1904–1906
 First Deakin Government

Notes

References 

Federal elections in Australia
1903 elections in Australia
December 1903 events